Marcus S. Gaspard (born 1948) is an American former politician in the state of Washington. He served in the Washington House of Representatives from 1973 to 1977 and in the Senate from 1977 to 1995.

References

Living people
1948 births
Democratic Party Washington (state) state senators
Democratic Party members of the Washington House of Representatives